Jean Joseph Alphonse Koppes (16 September 1843 – 29 November 1918) was Bishop of Luxembourg from 1883 to 1918.

Life
Johannes Joseph Koppes was born in Canach in 1843, the son of a schoolteacher Johann (Jean) Koppes and his wife Anna Maria née Ernster.

At the age of 25, he was ordained a priest on 28 August 1868, and worked as a parson in Esch-Alzette.

As vicar, he was the spiritual father of the stigmatised and controversial Anna Moes (1832–1895), the founder of the Dominican monastery on Limpertsberg.

On 28 September 1883 he was appointed Bishop of Luxembourg, and was consecrated on 4 November of the same year by Cardinal Edward Henry Howard. Only the second person to hold the office since Luxembourg became a diocese in 1870, he exercised this function until his death on 29 November 1918.

His election as Bishop was supported by seminary professor Dominik Hengesch (1844–1899) and Msgr. Francesco Spolverini (1838–1918), the Internuntius for Luxembourg. Nikolaus Nilles SJ, who was initially a candidate, also supported Koppes in Rome. Koppes' motto as Bishop was Pax et Veritas. He acted combatively and boldly, especially against liberalism, socialism and Freemasonry. In the church terminology of the day, he was seen as an ultramontanist.

He regularly participated as a guest in the meetings of German bishops in Fulda. In 1913, Koppes was a speaker at the Deutscher Katholikentag in Metz, .

His uncompromising nature led to several conflicts with the liberal government. After Koppes died in Luxembourg city in 1918, the city council denied permission for him to be buried in the Cathedral. Instead, he was buried (like his predecessor Nicolas Adames) in the Glacis chapel in front of the walls of the former Fortress of Luxembourg.

References

1843 births
1918 deaths
19th-century Roman Catholic bishops in Luxembourg
20th-century Roman Catholic bishops in Luxembourg
Alumni of the Athénée de Luxembourg